The 1982 Independence Bowl was a post-season American college football bowl game between the Wisconsin Badgers and the Kansas State Wildcats at Independence Stadium in Shreveport, Louisiana on December 11, 1982. The game was the final contest of the 1982 NCAA Division I-A football season for both teams, and ended in a 14–3 victory for the Badgers.

The contest was the first college football game televised live by ESPN, and it was Wisconsin's first bowl victory. The national anthem was performed by the Centenary College Choir.

Game summary
Wisconsin quarterback Randy Wright tossed two touchdown passes as the Badgers overcame an early Kansas State lead for a hard-earned 14-3 victory over the Wildcats in the seventh annual Independence Bowl.

The game, played in cold and wet conditions before an announced crowd of 49,523, marked the first-ever Bowl appearance by Kansas State . A 23 mile-per-hour wind dropped temperatures to 10 below zero and kept many fans away.

After a scoreless first quarter, K-State took the game's first lead with 7:10 left in the second period when Steve Willis booted a 29-yard field goal after defensive end Bob Daniels recovered a fumble at the Badger 18-yard line.

The Wildcats' lead was short-lived, however. On Wisconsin 's ensuing drive following the field goal, the Badgers marched 79 yards in eight plays, scoring a touchdown on a 16-yard pass from Wright to Michael Jones to give UW a 7-3 halftime lead.

Wisconsin struck again midway through the third quarter, when game offensive MVP Wright connected with Tim Stracka on an 87-yard touchdown pass for a 14-3 Badger advantage.

K-State drove deep into Wisconsin territory on its next two possessions, but was unable to score.

One opportunity ended when a Wildcat pass was intercepted in the Badger end zone, while a second was stymied at the Wisconsin 26-yard line, when K-State could not convert on fourth down.

Darrell Ray Dickey completed 13 of 35 passes for 127 yards and one interception on the game for 1982 Big Eight Coach of the Year Jim Dickey's Wildcat squad.

The 35 pass attempts stood as a Kansas State bowl record until 2004, when Ell Roberson's 51 attempts in the 2004 Tostitos Fiesta Bowl vs. Ohio State.

References

Independence Bowl
Independence Bowl
Kansas State Wildcats football bowl games
Wisconsin Badgers football bowl games
Independence Bowl
December 1982 sports events in the United States